Peter Bojkov Vitanov (Bulgarian: Петър Бойков Витанов, Pet'r Bojkov Vitanov, born 18 April 1982) is a Bulgarian politician and a former member of the Bulgarian Socialist Party who was elected as a Member of the European Parliament in 2019.

Political career
In parliament, Vitanov serves on the Committee on the Environment, Public Health and Food Safety and the Committee on Transport and Tourism.

In addition to his committee assignments, he is part of parliament's delegations to the EU-Armenia Parliamentary Partnership Committee, the EU-Azerbaijan Parliamentary Cooperation Committee and the EU-Georgia Parliamentary Association Committee, and to the Euronest Parliamentary Assembly. He is also a member of the European Parliament Intergroup on LGBT Rights.

Political positions
In October 2021, Vitanov initiated a nonbinding resolution in which a majority of the European Parliament called for a ban on police use of facial recognition technology in public places, and on predictive policing.

References

MEPs for Bulgaria 2019–2024
Bulgarian Socialist Party MEPs
1982 births
Living people